The Brazilian Judo Confederation ( (CBJ)) is the national body responsible for managing and promoting the sport of judo in Brazil, founded on 18 March 1969 and headquartered in Rio de Janeiro.

The CBJ is affiliated with the International Judo Federation. Since 2013, its president has been Paulo Wanderley Teixeira.

See also
 Brazil at the World Judo Championships

External links

National members of the International Judo Federation
Judo
Judo in Brazil